"No Más" (Spanish for "No More") is the first episode of the third season of the American television drama series Breaking Bad. Written by Vince Gilligan and directed by Bryan Cranston, it aired on AMC in the United States on March 21, 2010.

This episode introduces assassins Marco and Leonel Salamanca.

Plot 
Leonel and Marco Salamanca make a pilgrimage to a Mexican shrine to Santa Muerte, making an offering and leaving a drawing of Heisenberg at the shrine.

A week after the mid-air plane collision, all of Albuquerque remains in shock. A depressed Walter White is living in his home alone following the departure of his wife, Skyler White, who has moved out with their son and newborn daughter to give Walt a chance to pack his things. Walt has pieced together that Donald Margolis inadvertently caused the plane crash after being distracted by his grief over his daughter Jane's death. Remorseful, he burns several bundles of money on the barbecue, but at the last moment changes his mind and throws the bills into the pool. While helping Walt to transport his belongings to a new apartment, Hank Schrader lifts the bag containing the money Walt obtained in his deal with Gus Fring. Walt openly admits the existence of the money, but Hank laughs, believing it to be a joke. Once in his new apartment, Walt calls to give his family his new address. He later receives a text message reading "POLLOS". At a school assembly, Walt becomes agitated as both teachers and students open up about the traumas they experienced due to the plane collision. When prompted to share his thoughts, he delivers an awkward speech comparing the accident to the Tenerife airport disaster, disturbing the assembled audience by advising them to "look on the bright side".

Skyler speaks to a divorce lawyer about making her separation from Walt permanent but hesitates when the attorney mentions the possibility of uncovering money Walt may have hidden. After being given a ride home from school by his father, Walter Jr. argues with both his parents and expresses his anger towards Skyler, who refuses to give him an explanation. She also refuses when asked by her sister Marie Schrader. Finally, she confronts Walt, presenting him with divorce papers. When she accuses him of being a drug dealer, Walt admits to being a methamphetamine cook. Skyler storms off in horror, pleading that she will not expose his secret to his children and to Hank if he grants her the divorce.

Walt's former business partner, Jesse Pinkman, is in rehab trying to overcome his drug addiction and come to terms with his girlfriend Jane Margolis' death, expressing his own personal self-loathing and guilt. During one session, the group leader confesses that, high on cocaine on a birthday of his that occurred a decade earlier, he ran over and killed his own daughter in his pick-up truck while desperately trying to reach vodka at a liquor store. He follows this up by saying that hating oneself is only an impediment to moving on. Walt picks up Jesse and takes him to his apartment, where Jesse expresses remorse over the events that led to the mid-air collision. Walt tells him he is not responsible for what happened, but Jesse calmly insists that he has learned not to shy away from who he really is: "the bad guy". Inspired by this, Walt visits Gus at Los Pollos Hermanos and tells him of his decision to get out of the meth business. Gus presents an offer for Walt to make $3 million for three months' work; Walt briefly reconsiders but ultimately refuses.

Meanwhile, the Salamanca twins cross into the US from Mexico hidden in the back of a truck, in search of Heisenberg. After another migrant discovers their affiliation with the Juarez Cartel, they kill their fellow passengers and the driver of the truck before blowing it up.

Production 
The episode was written by Vince Gilligan, and directed by Bryan Cranston; it aired on AMC in the United States and Canada on March 21, 2010. The title of the episode means "no more" in Spanish, and refers to Walt's decision to quit the meth business.

Reception 
Seth Amitin of IGN gave the episode an 8.8 rating; he also stated Breaking Bad comes back after its eight-month hiatus with "No Más," "A wonderful and wonderfully-titled episode. The show is mixing its pitches in the season 3 premiere. After a hard plane-crashing fastball, we're getting an emotionally impacted change-up that lands softly into the catcher's mitt." While The A.V Club gave the episode an A rating. The episode's original broadcast was viewed by 1.95 million people.

In 2019, The Ringer ranked "No Más" 54th out of the 62 total Breaking Bad episodes.

At the 62nd Primetime Creative Arts Emmy Awards, Michael Slovis was nominated for Outstanding Cinematography for a Single-Camera Series (One Hour) for his work on this episode, while Skip Macdonald was nominated for Outstanding Single-Camera Picture Editing - Drama Series.

References

External links 
"No Más" at the official Breaking Bad site

2010 American television episodes
Breaking Bad (season 3) episodes
Television episodes written by Vince Gilligan
Television episodes about suicide